Following are the official winners of the national Colombian Chess Championships from 1928 to date.  The first Colombian Men's Championship was held in Cali in 1928, and first Women's Championship in Bogotá in 1965.

Men's Champions 
{| class="sortable wikitable"
! Year !! City !! Winner
|-
| 1928 || Cali || Alfonso Herrera 
|-
| 1938 || Bogotá || Luis Augusto Sánchez
|-
| 1941 || Bucaramanga || Miguel Cuéllar
|-
| 1946 || Bogotá || Miguel Cuéllar
|-
| 1947 || Bogotá || Luis Augusto Sánchez
|-
| 1948 || Bogotá || Luis Augusto Sánchez
|-
| 1951 || Bogotá || Boris de Greiff
|-
| 1953 || Bogotá || Miguel Cuéllar
|-
| 1954 || Cali || Luis Augusto Sánchez
|-
| 1955 || Manizales || Miguel Cuéllar
|-
| 1956 || Ibagué || Miguel Cuéllar
|-
| 1957 || Montería || Miguel Cuéllar
|-
| 1958 || Pereira || Luis Augusto Sánchez
|-
| 1959 || Barranquilla || Miguel Cuéllar
|-
| 1961 || Medellín || Miguel Cuéllar
|-
| 1962 || Buga || Luis Augusto Sánchez
|-
| 1963 || Cúcuta || Juan Minaya Molano
|-
| 1964 || Villavicencio || José Salvador Rodríguez
|-
| 1965 || Belencito (Nobsa) || Carlos Cuartas
|-
| 1967 || Bucaramanga || Carlos Cuartas
|-
| 1968 || Medellín || Carlos Cuartas
|-
| 1969 || Bogotá || José Salvador Rodríguez
|-
| 1970 || Bogotá || Carlos Cuartas
|-
| 1971 || Bucaramanga || Miguel Cuéllar
|-
| 1972 || Barranquilla || Oscar Castro
|-
| 1974 || Medellín–Bogotá || Oscar Castro
|-
| 1975 || Bogotá || Carlos Cuartas
|-
| 1976 || Cali || carlos cuartas
|-
| 1977 || Medellín || Gildardo García
|-
| 1978 || Envigado || Gildardo García
|-
| 1979 || Manizales || Jorge González
|-
| 1980 || Pereira || Alonso Zapata
|-
| 1981 || Bogotá || Alonso Zapata
|-
| 1983 || Envigado || Carlos Cuartas
|-
| 1985 || Bucaramanga || Gildardo García
|-
| 1986 || Bogotá || Gildardo García
|-
| 1987 || Cali || Gildardo García
|-
| 1988 || Bogotá || Luis Baquero
|-
| 1989 || Manizales || Darío Alzate
|-
| 1990 || Bucaramanga || Gildardo García
|-
| 1991 || Cartagena || Gildardo García
|-
| 1992 || Armenia || Oscar Castro
|-
| 1993 || Chía || Jorge González
|-
| 1994 || Medellín || Oscar Castro
|-
| 1995 || Cartagena || Gildardo García & Alonso Zapata
|-
| 1996 || Bucaramanga || Alonso Zapata
|-
| 1997 || Bogotá || Jorge Mario Clavijo
|-
| 1998 || Pensilvania || Darío Alzate
|-
| 1999 || Fusagasugá || Oscar Castro
|-
| 2000 || Bogotá || Alonso Zapata
|-
| 2001 || Medellín || Darío Alzate
|-
| 2002 || Bogotá || Alonso Zapata
|-
| 2003 || Cali || Gildardo García
|-
| 2004 || Girardot || Alonso Zapata
|-
| 2005 || Medellín || Darío Alzate
|-
| 2006 || Arauca || Gildardo García
|-
| 2007 || Cartagena || Alder Escobar Forero 
|-
| 2008 || San Andrés  || Alonso Zapata
|-
| 2009 || Buga   || Castano Duvan
|-
| 2010 || El Bagre || David Arenas 
|-
| 2011 || Pereira|| Sergio Barrientos
|-
| 2012 || Pamplona|| Miguel Mosquera
|-
| 2013 || Tolima || Juan Camilo Torres 
|-
| 2014 || El Bagre || Joshua Daniel Ruiz Castillo 
|-
| 2015 || Quibdo || David Arenas
|-
| 2016 || La Dorada || Cristian Camilo Ríos
|-
| 2017 || Palmira Valle del Cauca || Joshua Daniel Ruiz Castillo
|-
| 2018 ||  || 
|-
| 2019 ||  || 
|-
| 2020 || Fusagasuga || Sergio Barrientos
|}

Women's Champions 
{| class="sortable wikitable"
! Year !! City !! Winner
|-
| 1965 || Bogotá || Ilse Guggenberger	
|-
| 1972 || Bogotá || Ilse Guggenberger
|-
| 1974 || Bogotá || Ilse Guggenberger
|-
| 1975 || Bogotá || Ilse Guggenberger
|-
| 1976 || Moniquirá || Teresa Leyva
|-
| 1977 || Bogotá || Rosalba Patiño
|-
| 1978 || Cartagena || Ilse Guggenberger
|-
| 1979 || Girardot || Ilse Guggenberger
|-
| 1980 || Bucaramanga || Ilse Guggenberger
|-
| 1981 || Riohacha || Adriana Salazar Varón
|-
| 1982 || Sevilla || Teresa Leyva
|-
| 1983 || Bucaramanga || Adriana Salazar Varón
|-
| 1984 || Bucaramanga || Ilse Guggenberger
|-
| 1985 || Bogotá || Adriana Salazar Varón
|-
| 1986 || Bogotá || Adriana Salazar Varón
|-
| 1987 || Ibagué || Isolina Majul
|-
| 1988 || Bogotá || Adriana Salazar Varón
|-
| 1989 || Armenia || Isolina Majul
|-
| 1990 || Bogotá || Isolina Majul
|-
| 1991 || Bogotá || Isolina Majul
|-
| 1992 || Medellín || Adriana Salazar Varón
|-
| 1993 || Cartagena || Adriana Salazar Varón
|-
| 1994 || Cartagena || Adriana Salazar Varón
|-
| 1995 || Saravena || Martha Liliana García
|-
| 1996 || Bucaramanga || Adriana Salazar Varón
|-
| 1997 || Bogotá || Isolina Majul
|-
| 1998 || Pensilvania, Caldas || Isolina Majul
|-
| 1999 || Cali || Isolina Majul
|-
| 2000 || Bogotá || Martha Mateus
|-
| 2001 || Cali || Nadya Karolina Ortíz
|-
| 2002 || Bogotá || Marisela Palao
|-
| 2003 || Bogotá || Martha Mateus
|-
| 2004 || ? || Angela María Franco
|-
| 2005 || Medellín || Ingris Rivera
|-
| 2006 || Arauca || Nadya Carolina Ortiz
|-
| 2007 || Cartagena || Martha Mateus
|-
| 2008 || Yopal || Marisela Palao
|-
| 2009 || Buga || Angela Maria Franco Valencia
|-
| 2010 || El Bagre || Jenny Astrid Chirivi Castiblanco
|-
| 2011 || Pereira || Aura Cristina Salazar
|-
| 2012 || El Bagre || Angela Maria Franco Valencia
|-
| 2013 || Ibagué || Paula Andrea Rodriguez Rueda
|-
| 2014 || El Bagre || Beatriz Irene Franco Valencia
|-
| 2015 || Quibdo || Ingris Rivera
|-
| 2016 || La Dorada || Paula Andrea Rodriguez Rueda
|-
| 2017 || || 
|-
| 2018 || || 
|-
| 2019 || || 
|-
| 2020 || Fusagasuga || Melissa Castrillón Gómez
|-

|}

References

Campeonato de Colombia
Campeones y Campeonas Nacionales de Colombia
Campeones Colombianos de ajedrez
Results 2002 from TWIC
Results 2003 from TWIC
FIDE report National Championship Greater COL Men 2004
Campeonato de Colombia
Results 2005 from the national federation
Results 2006 from the national federation
Results 2007 from TWIC

Chess in Colombia
Chess national championships
Women's chess national championships
Recurring sporting events established in 1928
1928 in chess
Chess
Recurring sporting events established in 1965
1965 in chess
Chess
Chess